Colin Lousich (30 March 1925 – 9 March 2002) was a New Zealand long-distance athlete who represented his country at the 1950 British Empire Games, and won one national athletics title.

Athletics
Lousich represented New Zealand at the 1950 British Empire Games in Auckland. He competed in the men's 3 miles race, finishing sixth in a time of 14:41.0, and the men's 6 miles, in which he failed to finish.

The following year, he won the 6 miles title representing Auckland at the New Zealand national athletics championships, recording a time of 33:12.6.

Later life and death
Lousich worked as a nurseryman. He died on 9 March 2002, and was buried at Swanson Cemetery.

References

1925 births
2002 deaths
Athletes from Auckland
New Zealand male middle-distance runners
Athletes (track and field) at the 1950 British Empire Games
Commonwealth Games competitors for New Zealand